Blissus insularis, the southern chinch bug, is a species of true bug in the family Blissidae. It is found in North America and Oceania.

References

 Nishida, Gordon M., ed. (2003). "Hawaiian Terrestrial Arthropod Checklist, 4th ed.". Bishop Museum Technical Reports no. 22, iv + 313.
 Thomas J. Henry, Richard C. Froeschner. (1988). Catalog of the Heteroptera, True Bugs of Canada and the Continental United States. Brill Academic Publishers.

Further reading

 

Blissidae
Insects described in 1918